{{DISPLAYTITLE:C7H10O3}}
The molecular formula C7H10O3 (molar mass: 142.15 g/mol) may refer to:

Glycidyl methacrylate
Triacetylmethane
2,4,6-Heptanetrione

Molecular formulas